Baron Robertson of Oakridge, of Oakridge in the County of Gloucester, is a title in the Peerage of the United Kingdom. It was created on 29 June 1961 for the military commander Sir Brian Robertson, 2nd Baronet. He had previously served as Military Governor of the British Zone in occupied Germany from 1947 to 1949. The Robertson baronetcy, of Welbourn in the County of Lincoln, was created in the Baronetage of the United Kingdom on 4 October 1919 for his father, Field Marshal Sir William Robertson, Chief of the Imperial General Staff from 1915 to 1918.  the titles are held by the first Baron's grandson, the third Baron, who succeeded his father in 2009.

Robertson baronets, of Beaconsfield (1919)

Sir William Robert Robertson, 1st Baronet (1860–1933)
Sir Brian Hubert Robertson, 2nd Baronet (1896–1974) (created Baron Robertson of Oakridge in 1961)

Barons Robertson of Oakridge (1961)
Brian Hubert Robertson, 1st Baron Robertson of Oakridge (1896–1974)
William Ronald Robertson, 2nd Baron Robertson of Oakridge (1930–2009)
William Brian Elworthy Robertson, 3rd Baron Robertson of Oakridge (b. 1975)

There is no heir to the titles.

Notes

References
Kidd, Charles, Williamson, David (editors). Debrett's Peerage and Baronetage (1990 edition). New York: St Martin's Press, 1990, 

1919 establishments in the United Kingdom
1961 establishments in the United Kingdom
Noble titles created in 1961
Baronies in the Peerage of the United Kingdom